Chortitz is an unincorporated community in south central Manitoba, Canada. It is located approximately 8 kilometers (5 miles) southwest of Winkler, Manitoba in the Rural Municipality of Stanley.

References 

Unincorporated communities in Pembina Valley Region